Oedaspis quinquiefasciata is a species of tephritid or fruit flies in the genus Oedaspis of the family Tephritidae.

Distribution
Canary Islands.

References

Tephritinae
Insects described in 1908
Diptera of Europe
Taxa named by Theodor Becker